University of Toulouse-Jean Jaurès (formerly known as Université de Toulouse-Le Mirail, also called Toulouse II) is a French public university located in Toulouse, France. It is one of the 3 successor universities of the University of Toulouse.

History
University of Toulouse-Jean Jaurès was hastily conceived as a result of the saturation of the original buildings in the city centre and the events of May 1968. At that time it was decided to divide the University of Toulouse into three: The law faculty became Université Toulouse I, occupying all the old university buildings, the humanities faculty became Université de Toulouse II – Le Mirail, named after its new location, and the departments of science and medicine became Université Paul Sabatier (Toulouse III). In 1969, a fourth university in Toulouse was created, Institut National Polytechnique de Toulouse, a school of engineering. Université de Toulouse II – Le Mirail was subsequently renamed Université de Toulouse II – Jean Jaurès after the famous politician Jean Jaurès.

Campus 

The campus, situated in Toulouse's grand architectural project of the 1960s, Le Mirail, was conceived and built by the team of architects Candilis, Josic, Woods.

After the opening of many extensions (one of which was situated in military barracks) in order to free up the university in the city centre, the campus in Le Mirail opened one section at a time starting in 1971, and completed the transfer by 1973. Planned for 11,000 students, the university today is a victim of its own success, with a student population of roughly 27,500.

Organisation
As the humanities university of Toulouse, it is organised into many pedagogical components: UFRs (unités de formation et de recherche) and university institutes.

School of History, Arts and Archeology
 Department of Anthropology
 Department of Documentation, Archives, Media and Editing
 Department of History
 Department of Art History and Archeology

School of Languages, Literature and Foreign Civilisations
 Department of Translation and Linguistic Interpretation
 Department of Foreign French Language Studies
 Department of Anglophone Studies
 Department of Hispanic Studies
 Department of Foreign Languages
 Department of Applied Foreign Languages
 Department of Linguistics

School of Literature, Philosophy, Music, Arts and Communication
 Department of Design
 Department of Communication and Visual Studies
 Department of Literature, Languages and Ancient Civilisations
 Department of Music
 Department of Philosophy

School of Psychology
 Department of Clinical Psychology
 Department of Cognitive Psychology and Ergonomics
 Department of Developmental Psychology
 Department of Social and Organisational Psychology
 Department of Psychopathology, Health Psychology and Neuroscience

School of Science, Place and Society
 Department of Geography and the Environment
 Department of Informatics
 Department of Education
 Department of Economics and Management
 Department of Sociology

It also has two University Institutes of Technology and several other specialist institutes.

Research
Research is organised in a series of interdisciplinary research centres.  These include:
 Centre for Work and Organisations  (CERTOP)
 Centre for Cognition, Languages and Ergonomics (CLLE)
 Centre for Education and Knowledge (EFTS)
 Centre for the Study of France, the Americas and Spain (FRAMESPA)
 Centre for Environmental Geography (GEODE)
 Institute of Mathematics (IMT)
 Institute of Information Technology (IRIT)
 Centre for the Study of the Economy, Politics and Social Systems (LEREPS)
 Centre for the Study of Societies (LISST)
 Centre for Archaeology (TRACES).

Reputation

In 2022, it was ranked in the 1001-1200 band of universities in the world.

Notable faculty
 Bartolomé Bennassar (1929-2018) - historian and writer
 Gérard Granel (1930-2000) - philosopher and translator
 Alain Ducellier (1934-2018) - historian
 René Souriac (born 1941) - historian
 Patrick Le Roux (born 1943) - historian
 Michel Zink (born 1945) - writer, medievalist, philologist
 Henry Fourès (born 1948) - historian of music and musician.
 Ángel Bahamonde Magro (born 1949) - Spanish historian
 Christian Galan (born 1960) - Japanese language and civilisation
 Jean-François Berdah (born 1961) - historian
 Corinne Maury - film studies
 Jean-Marc Olivier (born 1961) - historian

Notable alumni
 Bartolomé Bennassar (1929-2018) - historian and writer.
 Jean-Luc Nancy (1940-2021) - philosopher
 Patrick Le Roux (born 1943) - historian
 Abdelhak Serhane (born 1950) - Moroccan novelist
 Bernard Stiegler (1952-2020) - philosopher
 Aida Toledo  (born 1952) - Guatemalan poet, short story writer, non-fiction writer and educator
 John Sibi-Okumu (born 1954) - Kenyan actor and journalist
 Jacques Jaubert (born 1957) - prehistorian and Paleolithic archaeologist
 Gilles Poux - politician
 Mohammed Ameur (born 1959) - Moroccan politician 
 Joël Suhubiette (born 1962) - choral conductor. 
 Christian Authier (born 1969) - novelist and journalist
 Stéphan Perreau (born 1969) - contemporary musician and art historian
 Maria Ubach i Font (born 1973) - Andorran diplomat
 Ekaterina Velmezova (born 1973) - Russian and Swiss philologist, professor of Slavistics and of history and epistemology of language sciences 
 Guðbjörg Vilhjálmsdóttir - Icelandic professor in Career Guidance and Counselling
 Judy Quinn (born 1974) - Canadian writer and editor
 Marie-Sophie Lacarrau (born 1975) - journalist and TV presenter.

See also
 University of Toulouse

References

External links
 Université Toulouse II

University of Toulouse
Universities and colleges in Toulouse
Educational institutions established in 1969
Jean Jaurès